The metropolitan areas of the State of Kentucky include the urban statistical areas that are defined by the United States Office of Management and Budget and regions of urban population in which are defined by other organizations.

Metropolitan statistical areas
The following tables list population figures for the metropolitan statistical areas of Kentucky, in rank of population.

The following table describes these areas with the following information:
The name of the county
The population of the county as of July 1, 2009, as estimated by the United States Census Bureau
The county population as of April 1, 2000, as counted by the United States Census 2000, and 
The percent county population change from April 1, 2000, to July 1, 2009, as estimated by the United States Census Bureau.

Bowling Green, KY MSA

Cincinnati-Middletown, OH-KY-IN MSA

Clarksville-Hopkinsville, TN-KY MSA

Elizabethtown, KY MSA

Evansville, IN-KY MSA

Huntington-Ashland, WV-KY-OH MSA

Lexington-Fayette, KY MSA

Louisville-Jefferson County, KY-IN MSA

Owensboro, KY MSA

References

See also

State of Kentucky
Demographics of Kentucky
Geography of Kentucky
United States
United States Census Bureau
Table of United States Combined Statistical Areas (CSA)
Table of United States Core Based Statistical Areas (CBSA)
Table of United States Metropolitan Statistical Areas (MSA)
Table of United States Micropolitan Statistical Areas (μSA)
Table of United States primary census statistical areas (PCSA)

 
Metropolitan areas
Kentucky